20th Century Masters – The Millennium Collection: The Best of Robert Palmer is a compilation album by Robert Palmer released through Universal Music Group The collection spans his history from 1974 through 1985.

Track listing

References

Robert Palmer (singer) compilation albums
1999 greatest hits albums
Palmer, Robert
Island Records compilation albums
Universal Music Group compilation albums